Greetings From Tennessee is a ten-song album from Superdrag released by Arena Rock Recording Co. and Two Children Records in 2001. Greetings From Tennessee contained four new songs and six re-recorded songs.  Of the re-recorded songs, three were covers: "Bastards of Young", off The Replacements' album Tim, "You Really Got Me" by The Kinks, and "Means So Much" by Sam Powers' former band Who Hit John.

Track listing
"Baby Goes to Eleven" (Davis) - 4:07
"Stu" (Powers) - 2:58
"I Guess It's American" (Davis/Adam Schlesinger) - 2:44
"The Emotional Kind" (Davis) - 4:22
"Take Your Spectre Away" (Davis) - 3:34
"Bloody Hell" (Davis) - 4:00
"Liquor" (Davis) - 3:11
"Means So Much" (Powers) - 4:09
"Bastards of Young" (Paul Westerberg) - 3:30
"You Really Got Me" (Ray Davies) - 2:11

Personnel
 John Davis – vocals, guitars, piano, organ, bass
 Sam Powers – bass, vocals
 Don Coffey, Jr. – drums

External links
Arena Rock Recording Co.

Superdrag albums
2001 albums
Arena Rock Recording Company albums